Aris Tatarounis (Greek: Άρης Ταταρούνης; born May 4, 1989) is a Greek former professional basketball player. At a height of 1.92 m (6' 3") tall, he played at the point guard and shooting guard positions.

Professional career
Tatarounis began playing club basketball with the junior youth teams of Panathinaikos. In the 2005–06 season, he trained some with the senior men's team of Panathinaikos, but he did not play in any games with them. In the 2006–07 season, he played in Greece's semi-pro competition, the 3rd-tier level Greek B League, with Pagrati. He made his professional debut during the 2007–08 season with Panathinaikos.

In his club career, Tatarounis played with the following clubs: Pagrati, Panathinaikos, Panelefsiniakos, Ionikos NF, KAP Agia Paraskevi, Near East, and Sporting.

National team career
Tatarounis was a member of the Greek junior national under-16 and Greek junior national under-18 teams, and with the Greek junior national teams, he played at the 2005 FIBA Europe Under-16 Championship and the 2006 Balkans Under-18 Championship.

References

External links
FIBA Archive Profile
FIBA Europe Profile
Euroleague.net Profile
Eurobasket.com Profile
Greek Basket League Profile 
Draftexpress.com Profile

1989 births
Living people
Basketball Agia Paraskevi players
Greek men's basketball players
Greek Basket League players
Ionikos N.F. B.C. players
Near East B.C. players
Pagrati B.C. players
Panathinaikos B.C. players
Panelefsiniakos B.C. players
Point guards
Shooting guards
Sporting basketball players
Basketball players from Athens